Money Boy (born June 27, 1981 in Vienna, also known as Mbeezy, interim Why SL Know Plug, YSL Know Plug, Why SL Beezy, Mbeezy Pineapple The Fruit Dude and other pseudonyms, born as Sebastian Meisinger) is an Austrian rap-singer. He became famous with his hit Dreh den Swag auf.

Biography
Money Boy grew up in the 15th district of Vienna, Rudolfsheim-Fünfhaus. By 2008, he studied Journalism and Communication at the University of Vienna. He successfully graduated with the degree Magister philosophiae. His master's thesis was about Gangsta Rap in Germany. Before starting with rap, he played basketball for a long time. He initially wrote his lyrics in English. After his first public title, Ching, Chang, Chung, Money Boy caught attention in late summer 2010 after publishing his cover Version of Soulja Boy's Turn My Swag On, Dreh den Swag auf.

In 2014, he gained attention for his appearance in a live show on Swiss TV channel joiz, during which he recommended the recreational use of Heroin and MDMA at parties. Some of the Twitter messages which were contributed by the TV audience, and were read out on live TV by a moderator included ″Take drugs and rape sluts" and "I just took Heroin and I'm having a really good time"; regarding the latter one, the moderator stated that he "did not know if this is meant seriously or just a joke". One of the moderators also alleged that he urinated on the wall of the TV station building during a break. For that performance, Money Boy got an award by German TV station ProSieben. He attended the awarding ceremony, which was broadcast on TV, and recited his acceptance speech as a rap.

In 2015, he performed with members of the Glo Up Dinero Gang at the sold out VideoDays, including an ambiguous statement about recreational drug use at the end of his performance: "Drugs are bad, I confess that shit; but I am high, so I have no problems with it.".

Glo Up Dinero Gang

He founded the Glo Up Dinero Gang, a gang that features various artists with a similar style and image; some of the more known artists include Spinning 9. Hustensaft Jüngling (Cough Syrup Youngster) and Medikamenten Manfred (Medication Manfred).

Discography

Albums 
 2013: SWAG
 2014: HiTunes
 2015: Cash Flow
 2016: Alles Ist Designer
 2018: Mann unter Feuer
 2019: Quick Mart
 2019: Geld Motivierte Muzik
 2020: Dripolympics
 2020: Feed The Skreetz
 2021: The Plug

EPs 
 2013: Trap Haus 
 2014: Hitunes 
 2015: Ca$h Flow
 2016: Der boy is immer crystal clean"

 Singles 
 2010: X-Mas Time 2011: Dreh den Swag auf (Club Remix)
 2013: Swaghetti Yolonese 2013: Yolohafte Swagnachten 2014: Einer Geht Noch 2014: Gay C D.B.n.C.''

Notes

References

Sources

Kronen Zeitung
Vice.
Vice.
Vice.
 Vice.
Musik Express
Express
Vienna Online
Heute
 Vienna Online

External links 
 YSL Know Plug on Youtube

1981 births
Living people
Austrian rappers